Will Ferrell is an American comedian and actor. He has received sixteen Primetime Emmy Award nominations winning three awards, one for Succession (2020), and twice for Live in Front of a Studio Audience (2019, 2020). Ferrell received two Golden Globe Award nominations for his performances in The Producers (2005), and Stranger than Fiction (2006). He also received a Tony Award nomination for Best Special Theatrical Event for  You're Welcome America. A Final Night with George W Bush (2009).

Major associations

Primetime Emmy Awards

Golden Globe Awards

Tony Awards

Miscellaneous awards

ESPY Awards

Golden Raspberry Awards

Kids' Choice Awards

Major League Soccer

MTV Movie & TV Awards

Saturn Awards

Satellite Awards

Spike TV Guys' Choice Awards

Teen Choice Awards

Honors

British GQ Men of the Year

Hollywood Walk of Fame

James Joyce Awards

Mark Twain Prize for American Humor

References

External links
 
Will Ferrell page on Funny Or Die

Awards
Lists of awards received by American actor